The Philippine Taxonomic Initiative (PTI) is a  private Philippine research institute and non-profit organization founded in 2018, located in the Philippines.

Publications
Publications:

M.R.B. Altamirano, M.C.D. Malay, & R.A.A. Bustamante. Check List 18(4): 829-837 (2022). New distribution record of Habenaria gibsonii var. foetida Blatt. & McCann (Orchidaceae, Orchidoideae) from Panay Island, Philippines, with notes on allied taxa, ecology, and conservation
C.J.P. Dela Cruz, S.R. Concepcion, & Y.P. Ang. Taiwaniana 67(2): 223‒228 (2022). Begonia francisabuidii, (section Baryandra, Begoniaceae) a new species endemic to Albay, Luzon Island, Philippines
J.A. Mansibang, & T.L.P. Senarillos. Philippine Journal of Science, 151(1), 497-501 (2022). Naked-faced Spiderhunter (Arachnothera clarae): a Flower Visitor and a Potential Pollinator of the Genus Aeschynanthus
R.A.A. Bustamante, & P.B. Pelser. Blumea 67 (1): 15–19 (2022). A new Philippine species of Ridsdalea (Rubiaceae, Ixoroideae) from karst vegetation in Palawan
L.M. Camangeg, W. Cabanillas, M.N. Tamayo, V.C. Mangussad, Y.P. Ang, & M.A.K. Pranada. Gardens’ Bulletin Singapore, 73, 399-412 (2021). Two endemic new species of Begonia (Begoniaceae) from Palawan, Philippines
L.M. Magtoto, M.N. Tamayo, L. Udasco, Jr., & R.A.A. Bustamante. Phytotaxa, 525(4), 295(300) (2021). Ardisia kalimbahin (Primulaceae, Myrsinoideae), a new species from the Philippines
K.R.F. Mazo, J. Mansibang, L.G. Aribal, & M.N. Tamayo. Webbia. Journal of Plant Taxonomy and Geography 76(2), 203-212 (2021). You ‘Sau’ Me! A new species and a rediscovery in the genus Saurauia (Actinidiaceae) from Zamboanga Peninsula, Mindanao Island, Philippines
R.A.A. Bustamante, C. Claudel, J.C. Altomonte, L. Udasco Jr., & M.N. Tamayo. Nordic Journal of Botany, 39(8) (2021). Amorphophallus minimus (Araceae), a new species from the montane forest of Nueva Ecija, Luzon island, Philippines
K.R.F. Mazo, L.G. Aribal, R.A.A. Bustamante, & Y.P. Ang. Phytotaxa, 516(1), 101–107 (2021). Begonia tinuyopensis (sect. Petermannia, Begoniaceae), a new species from Zamboanga Del Norte, Philippines
M.N. Tamayo, R.A.A. Bustamante, & P. Fritsch. PhytoKeys, 179, 145–154 (2021). Vaccinium exiguum (Ericaceae, Vaccinieae), a new species from the ultramafic summit of Mt. Victoria, Palawan Island, Philippines
P.B. Pelser, F. Brambach, J. Mansibang, H. Schaefer, R. Kiew, & J.F. Barcelona. Blumea 66 pp96–100 (2021). New combinations and names for some Philippine vascular plants
D.P. Buenavista, Y.P. Ang, M.A.K. Pranada, D.S. Salas, E. Mollee & M. McDonald. Phytotaxa 497 (2021). Begonia bangsamoro  (Begoniaceae, section Petermannia), a new species from Mindanao island, the Philippines 
S.M. Olimpos & J. Mansibang. Phytotaxa 487 (2021). Aeschynanthus rejieae (Gesneriaceae), a new species of lipstick vine from Tawi-Tawi, Philippines 
A.J.L. Saavedra, & K.M.E. Pitogo. Philippine Journal of Science (2021). Richness and Distribution of Orchids (Orchidaceae) in the Forests of Mount Busa, Sarangani, Southern Mindanao, Philippines
D. Tandang, T. Reyes Jr., R.A.A. Bustamante, J. Callado, E. Tadiosa, E. Agoo, & S. P. Lyon. Phytotaxa 477 (2020). Corybas boholensis (Orchidaceae): A New Jewel Orchid Species from Bohol Island, Central Visayas, Philippines
P. Quakenbush, P.L. Malabrigo Jr., A.G.A. Umali, A.B. Tobia, L.M. Camangeg, Y. P. Ang, & R.A.A. Bustamante. Systematic Botany (2020). Notes on the Medinilla (Melastomataceae) of Palawan, Philippines, Including Two New Species: M. simplicymosa and M. ultramaficola.
R.A.A. Bustamante, J. Mansibang, W. Hetterschied, & M.N. Tamayo. Nordic Journal of Botany e02982(2020) 2. Amorphophallus caudatus (Thomsonieae, Araceae) a new species from Camarines Norte, Luzon island, the Philippines
R.A.A. Bustamante, M.N. Tamayo, & W. Hetterschied, Webbia 75 (2020) 288. Rediscovery of a lost type: solving the mysterious identity of A. longispathaceus Engl. & Gehrm. (Araceae)
M.G. Rule, Y.P. Ang, R.R. Rubite, R. Docot, R. Bustamante, & A. Robinson, Phytotaxa 470 (2020) 226. Begonia makuruyot (Begoniaceae, section Baryandra), a new species from Surigao del Norte Province, Philippines
R.A.A. Bustamante, D. Tandang, M.A. Pranada, & Y.P. Ang, Phytotaxa 458 (2020) 217. Begonia truncatifolia (Begoniaceae, Sect. Baryandra) A new species from Palawan Island, The Philippines.  
 M.N. Tamayo, M.A. Pranada, & R.A.A. Bustamante. Phytotaxa 455 (2020) 241. Dendrochilum ignisiflorum (Coelogyneae, Orchidaceae), A new species from Luzon island, Philippines.
 Y.P. Ang, D. Tandang, R.R. Rubite, & R.A.A. Bustamante. Phytotaxa 455 (2020) 197. Begonia beijnenii (Batyandra, Begoniaceae), A new species from San Vicente, Palawan, The Philippines
Y.P. Ang, D. Tandang, J.M. Agcaoilli, & R.A.A. Bustamante. Phytotaxa 453 (2020) 245. Begonia cabanillasii (section Baryandra, Begoniaceae) a new species from el nido, Palawan, The Philippines
D. Tandang, R.A.A. Bustamante, U.F. Ferreras, U.F. Hadsall, S. Pim-Lyon, & A.S. Robinson. Phytotaxa 446 (2020) 136. Corybas circinatus (Orchidaceae) A new species from Palawan, The Philippines.
 R.V.A. Docot, L.C.P. Santiago, H. Funakoshi, & N.F. Lam. Edinburgh Journal of Botany, 77(3), 377–390 (2020).Two new species of Boesenbergia (Zinginberaceae) from Palawan, Philippines
 R.R. Rubite, M. Irabagon, D. Palacio, Y.P. Ang, & R.A.A. Bustamante. Phytotaxa 439 (2020) 291. Begonia caramoanensis (Begoniaceae) A new species from camarines sur, Philippines.
 J.M. Agacoilli, J. Barcelona, & P.B. Pelser. Phytotaxa 435 (2020) 26. Melastoma malabituin (Melastomaceae): A new species from northern Luzon, Philippines
 J. Tandang, E. Galindon, F. Tadiosa, V. Coritico, Amoroso, Lagunday, R.A.A. Bustamante, D. Pennys, & P. Fritsch. PhytoKeys 139:91-97 (2020) . Dilochia deleoniae (Orchidaceae), A new species from Mindanao, Philippines
 W.L.A. Hetterscheid, M.P. Medecilo, J.R.C. Callado, & A. Galloway. Blumea 65, 2020: 1–9. New species of Amorphophallus (Araceae) in the Philippines and an updated key
 J. van Beijnen & E.D. Jose. The Palawan Scientist, 12 (2020). Botanical observations from a threatened riverine lowland forest in Aborlan, Palawan, Philippines
 A.S. Robinson, S. Zamudio, & R. Caballero. Phytotaxa 423 (2019) 22. Nepenthes erucoides (Nepenthaceae), An ultramaficous micro-endemic from Dinagat islands province, Northern Mindanao, Philippines 
 R.V.A. Docot, N.P. Mendez, & C.B.M. Domingo. Gardens’ Bulletin Singapore 71 (2019) 448. A new species of hornstedia and a new species record of Globba (Zingiberaceae) from Palawan, Philippines

References

External links
Philippine Taxonomic Initiative

Taxonomy (biology) organizations
Organizations based in the Philippines